USS Perkins (DD-26) was a modified  in the United States Navy during World War I. She was the first ship named for Commodore George H. Perkins.

Perkins was laid down on 22 March 1909 by the Fore River Shipbuilding Company, Quincy, Massachusetts, christened by Commodore Perkins' daughter Isabel Weld Perkins and launched from the Fore River on 9 April 1910.  Perkins was commissioned on 18 November 1910, Lieutenant Commander Joel R. P. Pringle in command.

Service history
After almost seven years of peacetime service with active and reserve destroyer squadrons, Perkins recommissioned on 3 April 1917 with Lt. Cmdr. Forney Moore Knox in command.

In November 1917 she departed Ireland for New York, New York.

During the winter of 1917–1918, she underwent overhaul at Charleston, South Carolina. From March to December 1918 she operated out of Gravesend Bay, New York, on anti-submarine patrol and escort duty.

Entering the Reserve Fleet on 5 December 1919, she remained there until she was struck from the Naval Vessel Register on 8 March 1935, sold on 28 June, and scrapped.

References

 

Paulding-class destroyers
World War I destroyers of the United States
Ships built in Quincy, Massachusetts
1910 ships